The Bishop of Plymouth is the Ordinary of the Roman Catholic Diocese of Plymouth in the Province of Southwark, England.

The see is in the City of Plymouth where the bishop's seat is located at the Cathedral Church of Saint Mary and Saint Boniface.

The diocese of Plymouth was one of the dioceses erected on 29 September 1850 from the Vicariate Apostolic of the Western District. The bishop is the Right Reverend Mark O'Toole, the 9th Bishop of Plymouth, who was appointed on 9 November 2013 by Pope Francis.

List of bishops

See also 
St Boniface's Catholic College - school houses are named for the Bishops of Plymouth

References